Binary logic may refer to:

 Boolean logic, a two-valued formal logic
 Logic gates implementing Boolean logic in digital electronics
 Bivalent logic or two-valued logic, a logic satisfying the principle of bivalence

See also
 Binary numeral system